Rubén Camino (born 26 April 1959) is a retired Cuban pole vaulter.

Highly successful on the regional scene, he won the bronze medal at the 1978 Central American and Caribbean Games, then a string of gold medals at the 1979 and 1981 Central American and Caribbean Championships and the 1982 Central American and Caribbean Games. Following a bronze at the 1983 Central American and Caribbean Championships he again won the 1985 Central American and Caribbean Championships and the 1986 Central American and Caribbean Games, took the bronze medal at the 1986 Ibero-American Championships and the silver medal at the 1987 Pan American Games. He also represented the Americas at the 1981 IAAF World Cup, finishing seventh.

His personal best jump was 5.50 metres, achieved at the 1987 Pan American Games in Indianapolis.

References

1959 births
Living people
Cuban male pole vaulters
Central American and Caribbean Games gold medalists for Cuba
Central American and Caribbean Games bronze medalists for Cuba
Competitors at the 1978 Central American and Caribbean Games
Competitors at the 1982 Central American and Caribbean Games
Competitors at the 1986 Central American and Caribbean Games
Pan American Games medalists in athletics (track and field)
Athletes (track and field) at the 1987 Pan American Games
Pan American Games silver medalists for Cuba
Central American and Caribbean Games medalists in athletics
Medalists at the 1987 Pan American Games
21st-century Cuban people
20th-century Cuban people